Jonathan Baker Moore (March 16, 1825February 8, 1889) was an American businessman, politician, and Wisconsin pioneer.  He served one term in the Wisconsin State Assembly, representing Grant County, and was a Union Army officer during the American Civil War.

Biography
Moore was born on March 16, 1825, in Posey County, Indiana. In 1837, he and his family moved to Muscoda, Wisconsin. Moore died of a stroke on February 8, 1889, in Wauwatosa, Wisconsin, and is buried in Lancaster, Wisconsin. His entire estate was left to his wife, Christiana.

Political career
Moore was Constable of Platteville, Wisconsin, from 1849 to 1852 and Clerk of Platteville in 1853. He was elected to the Wisconsin State Assembly in 1860 as a Republican and as Sheriff of Grant County, Wisconsin, in 1861.

Military career
During the Civil War, Moore was appointed colonel of the Union Army's 33rd Wisconsin Infantry Regiment on October 18, 1862. He and the regiment later took part in the Red River Campaign, the Vicksburg Campaign, the Battle of Tupelo, the Battle of Atlanta, the Battle of Nashville, and the Battle of Spanish Fort. Moore was mustered out of the volunteers on August 9, 1865. On February 18, 1865, President Abraham Lincoln nominated Moore for appointment to the grade of brevet brigadier general of volunteers to rank from that date, and the United States Senate confirmed the appointment on March 3, 1865. On January 13, 1866, President Andrew Johnson nominated Moore for appointment to the grade of brevet brigadier general of volunteers to rank from March 26, 1865, and the United States Senate confirmed the appointment on March 12, 1866.

References

External links

|-

|-

People from Posey County, Indiana
People from Platteville, Wisconsin
Members of the Wisconsin State Assembly
Wisconsin sheriffs
People of Wisconsin in the American Civil War
Union Army colonels
1825 births
1889 deaths
People from Muscoda, Wisconsin
19th-century American politicians